Erwin von Busse also known as Granand or Erwin von Busse-Granand (12 January 1885 – 10 April 1939) was a German writer, artist, theater director, art historian and critic. His 1920 collection of short stories devoted to erotic male relationships was banned; it was republished in German in 1993 and in an English translation in 2022 as Berlin Garden of Erotic Delights. As a stage director for several years he worked with some of the most prominent figures of his time and he directed the world premiere of James Joyce's drama Exiles in 1919. He devoted himself to painting in his later years, living in exile in Brazil.

Biography

Early years
Erwin Oskar Leopold von Busse was born on 12 January 1885 in Magdeburg. His parents were Lieutenant Hugo Maximilian von Busse (1855–1922) and his wife Marie Louise Elisabeth Helene née Weste (1861–1935). He had a brother Rudolf Maximilian von Busse (1886–1957).

Erwin von Busse went to school in Magdeburg and Kiel. Beginning in 1898, he attended several military schools, ending with graduation in 1905 from the Prussian military academy in Gross-Lichterfelde. He spent the next two years performing his compulsory military service.

Beginning in 1907 he studied law in Munich, changing to art history in 1909. In 1912 he interrupted his studies for a trip to Brazil and a sojourn in Paris.

Art criticism
In 1912 he contributed an essay about Robert Delaunay to the Der Blaue Reiter Almanach. Reproductions of two recent Delaunay works, St. Séverin (1909) and The Window on the City (1911), illustrated the text. This essay has been praised for its "extraordinary insight" into Delaunay, who was soon to prove a critical leader in discovering the principles of expressionist and abstract art. Analyzing a few critical Delaunay canvases, von Busse traced the artist's shift from respect for the physical subject, to fracturing the object into particles formed and colored as "the dynamic needs of the space" require, and finally to excluding all references to the external world so that shape and color become the form and subject of the painting. Delaunay, in von Busse's words, now explores "the problem of space dynamics" without reference to the external world as he searches for the rules of "subjective understanding and representation".

Von Busse returned to his studies before the end of 1912, now at the University of Bern.

Theater
Von Busse then turned to the theater and before long settled in Berlin, where he edited , a theater magazine, in 1917. By that year he had also taken up the position of director and dramaturge at the Deutches Theater under Max Reinhardt, a dominant figure in the German-language theater. He directed several productions there in 1918–19. In 1919 he directed a revival of Walter Hasenclever's expressionist play The Son (1916), achieving greater success than Reinhardt had with the original production in 1918.

He moved to Munich and worked for Hermine Körner, who had starred in The Son. There he directed the world premiere of James Joyce's 1918 drama Exiles at the Munich Theater on 7 August 1919.

Other plays he directed included Candida by Shaw and Die Soldaten by Jakob Michael Reinhold Lenz. By 1925 he was no longer associated with a theater.

Fiction
Von Busse adopted the pseudonym Granand to publish  (Erotic Comedy Garden) in 1920. Its five stories depict a variety of sexually charged encounters between men, with characters that range from military school cadets and dance-hall regulars to a foreign businessman and a burglar. Granand wrote that his garden "has crooked, convoluted, and uncontrolled paths" but "over it all the great, hot sun shines, the melancholy moon passes by, and the innocent stars twinkle." There were two editions: a private edition of 100 copies with six illustrations by Rudolph Pütz (1896–1986) and a public edition of a few thousand copies with a slightly different text and five illustrations and a cover design by Ludwig Kainer (1885–1967). Above an enthusiastic review, Der Eigene, a bi-weekly gay newsletter, called the small printing a "luxury edition" and identified the bookstore that was handling sales.<ref name=Eigene> Review of Granand, Das erotische Komödien-Gärtlein.</ref>

Von Busse wrote with discretion to avoid government censorship. Though the Weimar Republic is celebrated for its "radical remaking of sexual norms", and its 1919 constitution prohibited censorship in principle, it also permitted statutes to regulate films, printed matter, and public presentations. For example, the film Different from the Others, which argued for the decriminalization of homosexuality, was released in May 1919 and banned nationwide in October 1920.

Regional courts in Berlin and Leipzig in 1920 and 1921 banned the distribution of von Busse's collection of stories because of "indecency" and ordered all copies confiscated or destroyed. The banned 1920 edition was not reprinted until 1993. Its first English translation was published in 2022 as Berlin Garden of Erotic Delights. Consistent with the 1920 edition, it identified the author as "Granand".

With illustrations by Kainer, its stories were "literary imitations of selections from Washington Irving's Tales of the Alhambra''" (1832). An attempt to ban this volume failed.

Later years
In 1925, von Busse contributed a slight volume to an art history series. By this time he was using a composite name, having added his pseudonym to his birth name to become "Erwin von Busse-Granand".

Using that name he emigrated to Brazil in 1928. In 1931 he took part in the group exhibition  (Revolutionary Salon) at the Escola Nacional de Belas Artes in Rio de Janeiro, the first of its annual exhibitions to host modernists.

He became a Catholic in 1933 and in London on 10 April of that year married Simonette Mathilde Kowarick, a wealthy woman and native of Brazil. They had no children. In Brazil he devoted himself to painting, concentrating on the South American landscape. He taught for a time at the Olinda School in São Paulo.

He died in São Paulo on 10 April 1939. A few months later,  mounted a memorial exhibition of von Busse's paintings at his galleries in Rio de Janeiro and São Paulo; the catalog included several illustrations of von Busse's paintings, two essays about Brazil by the artist, and a brief biography that did not mention his short story collections.

Works

See also
Expressionism (theatre)
German Brazilians
Weimar culture

Notes

References

German expatriates in Brazil
1885 births
1939 deaths
People from Magdeburg
University of Bern alumni
German art critics
German theatre directors
Berlin in fiction
1920s LGBT literature
Censored books
20th-century German short story writers
German male short story writers
20th-century pseudonymous writers